Chibwedziva is a place in Chiredzi District, Masvingo Province, Zimbabwe. Almost 99% of the inhabitants are Tsonga Shangaan people.

It has a secondary school.

References

Chiredzi District
Populated places in Masvingo Province